Stein Metzger (born November 17, 1972, in Honolulu, Hawaii) is a male beach volleyball player from the United States. He played college men's indoor volleyball at UCLA where he won 3 NCAA National championships under legendary coach Al Scates. Metzger competed in the AVP. In 2006 he played with his high school teammate, Mike Lambert, and they advanced to the Final Four in fourteen of the fifteen team events, winning five times. They formed the only team to not have a losing record against any other team that season.

Metzger made his Olympic beach volleyball debut at the 2004 Summer Olympics in Athens, Greece, where he and partner Dax Holdren finished fifth, after having won the silver medal the previous year at the 2003 Beach Volleyball World Championships in Rio de Janeiro, Brazil.

In 2005, Metzger teamed up with the 2004 Most Improved Player, Jake Gibb. The duo won both of their first two events together, becoming the third team since 1990 to accomplish that. They won in Belmar, then placed second in an FIVB Grand Slam event in Paris, logging the highest finish by an American team in 2005. The win in Manhattan Beach in 2005 made Gibb and Metzger the second team to win four domestic tournaments in a season since the turn of the century, and also marked the first time since the 2003 season opener that a number one-seeded team won an AVP open event.

Metzger led the 2005 Tour with four wins, as well as in points. He also led the Tour in digs in 2005 (950), ranked second in hitting percentage (.452) and third in kills (1,314). In 2006, he was third in kills (7.17 per game) and 10th in digs (4.12 per game). In 2001, with Kevin Wong, Metzger won his first two AVP events, in Santa Barbara and Manhattan Beach on consecutive weekends.

Prior to qualifying for the 2004 Summer Olympics, Metzger spent time competing internationally with former long-time partner Kevin Wong. The pair won the 2001 FIVB event in Switzerland and the bronze medal at the Goodwill Games in Australia. Metzger and Wong also won in Portugal in 2002. Metzger won a silver medal in Rio at the World Championships in 2003 with Holdren.

Originally from Honolulu, Metzger grew up surfing and playing beach volleyball at the Outrigger Canoe Club in Honolulu. He played indoor volleyball at Punahou High School. He was a three-time National Champion at UCLA where, as a setter, he earned AVCA All-American for three consecutive seasons, winning the 1996 NCAA MVP and William G. Morgan Award for most outstanding player. He graduated with a degree in Environmental Studies.

On October 9, 2009, Metzger was inducted into the UCLA Athletics Hall of Fame.

Recently, Stein has been involved in an instructional volleyball website known as Volleyball 1on1 involving the creation of instructional volleyball videos featuring coaching from himself and other well known players. Most recently, Stein was hired as the head coach of the women's beach volleyball team at UCLA.

See also
 World Fit
Stein Metzger's UCLA women's beach volleyball team won the 2018 NCAA title on May 6, 2018, defeating FSU.

References
 
 Perfect Indoor Volleyball Setting with Stein Metzger at Volleyball 1 on 1

External links
 Stein Metzger volleyball videos at Volleyball 1 on 1
 
 

1972 births
Living people
American men's beach volleyball players
Beach volleyball players at the 2004 Summer Olympics
Olympic beach volleyball players of the United States
Volleyball players from Honolulu
Punahou School alumni
Competitors at the 2001 Goodwill Games
Goodwill Games medalists in beach volleyball
UCLA Bruins men's volleyball players
UCLA Bruins women's beach volleyball